Gongorjavyn Davaa-Ochir (born 5 September 1977) is a Mongolian international footballer. He made his first appearance for the Mongolia national football team in 2000.

References

1977 births
Mongolian footballers
Mongolia international footballers
Khoromkhon players
Living people
Association football midfielders